Homer Historic District may refer to:

in the United States (by state)
Homer Historic District (Homer, Georgia), listed on the NRHP in Banks County, Georgia
Homer Historic District (Homer, Louisiana), listed on the NRHP in Claiborne Parish, Louisiana
Homer Village Historic District, Homer, Michigan, listed on the NRHP in Calhoun County, Michigan
Old Homer Village Historic District, Homer, New York, NRHP-listed, in Cortland County